Mount Pleasant Area Junior/Senior High School is a public high school in Mount Pleasant Township, Westmoreland County, Pennsylvania. It is part of the Mount Pleasant Area School District. It enrolls 1200 students in grades 7-12. It is located off Pennsylvania Route 981. The high school was opened in 1964, and the junior high was added in 1975.

Renovation
The complex was renovated in phases from April 2001 to August 2003. The renovation cost $23.5 Million and was completed in several phases. It included the addition of a modern Science Wing, modernized planetarium, natatorium, and gymnasiums. Additional office space was added, and internal telephones and internet access were added for each classroom.  The cafeteria was modernized into a food-court type setting, the library/media center was completely modernized, as well as the Guidance Area. A new board of directors room was added and the Auditorium was equipped with a state-of-the art lighting and sound system. The field house was renovated in 2007 and a new football field surface was installed, costing $2.6 Million. The athletic complex and MPASD Administration Building are also located on the secondary complex.

Sports teams
Mount Pleasant participates in PIAA District VII (WPIAL)

Vocational-technical school
Students in grades 10-12 have the opportunity to attend the Central Westmoreland Career and Technology Center in New Stanton.

Secondary clubs
There are several extra-curricular clubs at the secondary complex, including:

 Art
 Baseball
 Cheerleaders
 Chess
 Concert Band
 French
 French Honor Society
 Gamma Omega - Gifted
 Girls Basketball
Hockey Club
 Interact
 Jr. High Westmoreland Interscholastic Reading Competition
 Jr. High Newspaper
 Jr. High Student Council
 Jr. High Yearbook
LEO Club
 Marching Band 
 National Art Honor Society
 Quiz Team
 Students Against Drunk Driving (SADD)
 Senior High Student Council
 Senior High Westmoreland Interscholastic Reading Club
 Senior High Yearbook
Ski Club
 Soccer
 Softball
 Spanish
 Spanish Honor Society
 Spirit Club
 Student Theatre 
 Tri-M Music Honor Society
United We Stand Club
 Wrestling
 YEA

References

Public high schools in Pennsylvania
Buildings and structures in Westmoreland County, Pennsylvania
Schools in Westmoreland County, Pennsylvania
Educational institutions established in 1964
Public middle schools in Pennsylvania
1964 establishments in Pennsylvania